The Military ranks of Manchukuo were the military insignia used by the Manchukuo Imperial Army, Manchukuo Imperial Navy and Manchukuo Imperial Air Force during its existence, from its founding in 1932 until the Soviet invasion in 1945.

Corps colours

Commissioned officer ranks
The rank insignia of commissioned officers.

Rank flags

Other ranks
The rank insignia of non-commissioned officers and enlisted personnel.

References 
Citations

Bibliography

External links
 

Manchukuo
Ranks